Papua New Guinea competed at the 2004 Summer Olympics in Athens, Greece, from 13 to 29 August 2004.

Athletics

Papua New Guinean athletes have so far achieved qualifying standards in the following athletics events (up to a maximum of 3 athletes in each event at the 'A' Standard, and 1 at the 'B' Standard).

Men

Women

Key
Note–Ranks given for track events are within the athlete's heat only
Q = Qualified for the next round
q = Qualified for the next round as a fastest loser or, in field events, by position without achieving the qualifying target
NR = National record
N/A = Round not applicable for the event
Bye = Athlete not required to compete in round

Swimming

Papua New Guinean swimmers earned qualifying standards in the following events (up to a maximum of 2 swimmers in each event at the A-standard time, and 1 at the B-standard time):

Men

Weightlifting

Papua New Guinea has qualified a single weightlifter.

References

External links
Official Report of the XXVIII Olympiad

Nations at the 2004 Summer Olympics
2004
2004 in Papua New Guinean sport